The 30th Flying Training Wing was a training wing of the United States Army Air Forces.  It was last assigned to the Flying Division, Air Training Command, and was disbanded on 13 October 1946 at Randolph Field, Texas.

History
The wing was a World War II command and control organization which supported Training Command flight schools in the Lower Great Lakes and Southeastern United States.   The assigned schools provided phase III advanced two-engine flying training for air cadets, along with advanced B-24 Invader and B-25 Mitchell transition training for experienced pilots for reassignment to other flying units. Single-engine transition training was also instructed.  Air cadet graduates of the advanced schools were commissioned as second lieutenants, received their Aircrew Badge ("wings") and were reassigned to operational or replacement training units operated by one of the four numbered air fores in the zone of interior.

As training requirements changed during the war, schools were activated and inactivated or transferred to meet those requirements.

Lineage
 Established as 30th Flying Training Wing on 17 December 1942
 Activated on 26 December 1942
 Disbanded on 13 October 1946.

Assignments
 Army Air Forces Southeast Training Center, 26 December 1942
 Army Air Forces Eastern Flying Training Command, 15 September 1943
 Army Air Forces Western Flying Training Command, 15 December 1945
 Army Air Forces Flying Training Command, 1 January 1946
 Flying Division, Air Training Command, 1 July-13 October 1946.

Training aircraft
The two-engine advanced flying schools flew several trainers, designed for different tactical aircraft
 The Cessna AT-17 (AT-8)s were used for transport pilot training
 The Curtiss-Wright AT-9 was a high-performance trainer, to simulate P-38 Lightning two-engine fighters
 The Beechcraft AT-10 was used for bomber pilot training

Assigned pilot schools

 Blytheville Army Airfield, Blytheville, Arkansas
 AAF Pilot School (Advanced Two Engine):
 Opened: July 1942, Closed: November 1945 (AT-10, AT-17)
 Later become USAF Blytheville (Eaker) Air Force Base, Closed 1992

 Columbus Army Airfield, Columbus, Mississippi
 AAF Pilot School (Advanced Two Engine):
 26th Two-Engine Flying Training Group
 Opened: March 1942, Closed: August 1945 (AT-8, AT-9, AT-10, AT-17)
 Now USAF Columbus Air Force Base

 Freeman Army Airfield, Seymour, Indiana
 AAF Pilot School (Advanced Two Engine):
 33d Two-Engine Flying Training Group
 Opened: June 1943, Closed: February 1945 (AT-10)

 George Army Airfield, Lawrenceville, Illinois
 AAF Pilot School (Advanced Two Engine):
 30th Two-Engine Flying Training Group
 Opened: September 1942, Closed: July 1944 (AT-9, AT-10)
 Transferred to I Troop Carrier Command, September 1944

 Moody Army Airfield, Valdosta, Georgia
 AAF Pilot School (Advanced Two Engine):
 31st Two-Engine Flying Training Group
 Opened: January 1942, Closed: September 1944 (AT-9, AT-10, AT-17)
 Became Transition School for B-25s, A-26s, September 1944; Now USAF Moody Air Force Base

 Stuttgart Army Airfield, Stuttgart, Arkansas
 AAF Pilot School (Advanced Two Engine):
 32d Two-Engine Flying Training Group
 Opened: May 1943, Closed: September 1944 (AT-10)
 Field opened September 1942, used for Glider training until April 1943; became single-engine P-40, P-41 transition school September 1944, Closed December 1945

 Turner Army Airfield, Albany, Georgia
 AAF Pilot School (Advanced Two Engine):
 23d Two-Engine Flying Training Group
 Opened: July 1941, Closed: September 1944 (AT-7, AT-9, AT-10, AT-17)
 Became B-25 Mitchell transition school, September 1944;  later Turner Air Force Base, Closed 1967

Stations
 Jackson Army Airbase, Mississippi, 26 December 1942
 Columbus Army Airfield, Mississippi, 15 September 1943
 Turner Army Airfield, Georgia, 13 September 1944
 Randolph Field, Texas, 31 Jul – 13 Oct 1946.

See also

 Army Air Forces Training Command
 Other Eastern Flying Training Command Flight Training Wings:
 27th Flying Training Wing (World War II) Basic Flight Training
 28th Flying Training Wing (World War II) Advanced Flight Training, Single Engine
 29th Flying Training Wing (World War II) Primary Flight Training
 74th Flying Training Wing (World War II) Classification/Preflight/Specialized/Navigation
 75th Flying Training Wing (World War II) Gunnery
 76th Flying Training Wing (World War II) Specialized Four-Engine Training

References

Training wings of the United States Army Air Forces
Military units and formations established in 1942
1942 establishments in the United States
Military units and formations disestablished in 1946